Darkin  is an iOS game developed by German indie studio Ten Foiled Hats UG Haftungsbeschraenkt & Co KG and released on May 15, 2014.

Critical reception
The game has a Metacritic score of 85% based on 4 critic reviews.

TouchArcade wrote "Darkin is a very well-made attempt at capturing the spirit of a somewhat-neglected App Store great, and it hits considerably more than it misses. I think it falls a little short of the mark of replacing Dungeon Raid completely, but that still leaves it in a pretty great place." 148Apps said "Darkin is a darn fine puzzle-RPG that will suck up all your free time." Apple'N'Apps wrote "Darkin is a finely crafted matching adventure that stands by itself for an engaging experience that is a should buy." Pocket Gamer UK said "A well put together match-three puzzler with a solid RPG built around it, Darkin is well worth some time and effort."

References

2014 video games
IOS games
IOS-only games
Puzzle video games
Role-playing video games
Video games developed in Germany